Hazir Jawab Birbal is an Indian sitcom television series which premiered on 17 August 2015 on BIG Magic replacing the sitcom Akbar Birbal. The series is produced by Triangle Films Productions. It stars Saurabh Raj Jain as Emperor Akbar and Gaurav Khanna as Birbal in the main lead.

Plot synopsis
A strong central character, Birbal acts as an agent of change as identified with today’s world, targeting outcomes and transparency in governance issues. He is a strong central character who believes in democratic views and rights. Birbal is also Akbar’s biggest ally, critic, friend and philosopher, who encourages and guides him in his decision making.

Cast

Main cast
 Saurabh Raj Jain as Emperor Akbar
 Gaurav Khanna as Birbal
 Rimpi Das as Noor Ji
 Vishavpreet Kaur as Maham Anga
 Shoma Anand as Maham Anga 
 Vikas Khoker as  Adham Khan (Son of Maham Anga)
 Aishwarya Sakhuja as Fake Jalpari
 Pawan Singh as  Ibne
 Sumit Arora as Batuta
 Yashkant Sharma as Raja Darban

Special Appearance
 Anup Soni
 Aman Verma as Mohanlal (Episode 40)

References

External links
 Official website

2015 Indian television series debuts
Indian comedy television series
Big Magic original programming
Historical television series
Television shows based on fairy tales
Mughal Empire in fiction
Cultural depictions of Akbar